Shagai Fort is a fort located 13 kilometres from Jamrud in Khyber District, Khyber Pakhtunkhwa, Pakistan. It was built in 1927 by the British forces to oversee the Khyber Pass. The estimated terrain elevation above sea level is 847 metres. It is manned by Pakistani military and paramilitary troops serving as headquarters for the Khyber Rifles — the traditional guardians of the Khyber Pass.

Trilateral flag meetings among Pakistan, NATO and Afghan military officials are held in this fort.

Gallery

See also
List of forts in Pakistan

References

Forts in Khyber Pakhtunkhwa
Khyber Rifles